The Giurgiu is a left tributary of the river Bâsca Mică in Romania.

References

Rivers of Romania
Rivers of Buzău County